Grammothelopsis is a fungal genus in the family Polyporaceae. It was circumscribed in 1982 by Swiss mycologist Walter  Jülich, with Grammothelopsis macrospora as the type species.

Species of Grammothelopsis have fruit bodies that are effused-reflexed, meaning they are crust-like with a margin that is extended and bent backwards. The pores are shallow and irregular. The spores are large, thick-walled, and display a variable dextrinoid reaction to Melzer's reagent.

Species
, Index Fungorum accepts seven species of Grammothelopsis:

Grammothelopsis asiatica Y.C.Dai & B.K.Cui (2011) – China
Grammothelopsis bambusicola Ryvarden & de Meijer (2002) – Brazil
Grammothelopsis incrustata A.David & Rajchenb. (1985)
Grammothelopsis macrospora (Ryvarden) Jülich (1982) – Africa
Grammothelopsis neotropica Robledo & Ryvarden (2007) – Peru
Grammothelopsis puiggarii (Speg.) Rajchenb. & J.E.Wright (1987)
Grammothelopsis subtropica B.K.Cui & C.L.Zhao (2013) – southern China

Grammothelopsis fungi occur mainly in tropical Africa and America, with two species reported from China.

References

Polyporales genera
Polyporaceae
Fungi described in 1982
Taxa named by Walter Jülich